Patricio Marcelo Salas Huincahue (born 28 August 1988) is a Chilean former footballer. 

His last club was Deportes Melipilla.

Personal life
Salas Huincahue is of Mapuche descent.

Titles

Player
Magallanes
 Tercera División de Chile (1): 2010

Individual
 Tercera División de Chile Top scorer (1): 2010

References

External links
 
 

1988 births
Living people
People from Temuco
Chilean people of Mapuche descent
Chilean footballers
Club Deportivo Palestino footballers
Deportes Temuco footballers
Deportes Magallanes footballers
Magallanes footballers
San Antonio Unido footballers
Deportes Melipilla footballers
Chilean Primera División players
Primera B de Chile players
Segunda División Profesional de Chile players
Association football forwards
Mapuche sportspeople
Indigenous sportspeople of the Americas